Marian Sarr (born 30 January 1995) is a German footballer of Senegalese descent, who plays as a centre back for Bonner SC in the Regionalliga West. He is the older brother of Wilfried Sarr.

Club career

Early career
Sarr began his club career playing  at Schwarz-Weiß Essen then moved to Schalke 04 in the 2005–06 season before moving to Bayer Leverkusen in the 2008–09 season, where he ultimately succeeded to the second team. In the 2012–13 Regionalliga season, Sarr made ten appearances for Bayer Leverkusen second team as a defender during the first half of the 2012–13 season.

Borussia Dortmund
Sarr signed for Borussia Dortmund in the dawn of the 2012–13 Bundesliga season. The signing of Sarr by Borussia Dortmund from Bayer Leverkusen attracted the attention of the media, leading to a renewed debate about "talent theft" in football.  During the second half of the 2012–13 season, Sarr was enrolled initially in the Borussia Dortmund academy (U-19). In the 2013–14 Bundesliga season, Sarr was inducted into the Borussia Dortmund first team by Jürgen Klopp.

Sarr debuted for Borussia Dortmund II on 20 July 2013 on matchday 1 of the 2013–14 season in the 3. Liga against VfB Stuttgart II, in which Sarr made his professional debut.

Sarr made his Borussia Dortmund and UEFA Champions League debut on 11 December 2013 against Olympique de Marseille, helping his team win 2–1 and secure a spot in the round of 16 and win their group.

The defender had the first match in the Bundesliga on 14 December 2013 against TSG 1899 Hoffenheim.

On 11 June 2019, FC Carl Zeiss Jena announced that they had signed Sarr on a 2-year contract.

International career
Sarr represented the German U17 national football team that participated in the 2012 UEFA European Under-17 Football Championship in Slovenia. The German U17 national football team under coach Stefan Böger won all matches of the preliminary round, and won the semi-final against Poland U17 national football team 1–0, then conceded defeat in the final against the Netherlands U17 national football team in a 5–4 penalty shootout. He is also eligible for the Gambia national football team as his father Famara hails from Bakau.

Career statistics

Club

Honours

International
Germany
UEFA European Under-17 Football Championship Runners-up: 2012

References

External links

1995 births
Living people
German people of Gambian descent
German sportspeople of African descent
German footballers
Bayer 04 Leverkusen II players
Borussia Dortmund II players
Borussia Dortmund players
VfL Wolfsburg II players
VfR Aalen players
FC Carl Zeiss Jena players
Association football defenders
Bundesliga players
3. Liga players
Regionalliga players
Germany youth international footballers
Footballers from Essen